Hoseynabad-e Yek (also Romanized as Ḩoseynābād-e Yek; also known as Ḩoseynābād, Ḩoseynābād-e ‘Alī Shāhī, Ḩoseynābād-e Bālā’ī, Ḩoseynābād-e Khāneh Sorkh, Ḩoseynābād-e Khūnsorkh, Husainābād, Kahnūj, Kahnū Now, Khāneh Surkh, and Khūn Sorkh) is a village in Hoseynabad-e Goruh Rural District, Rayen District, Kerman County, Kerman Province, Iran. At the 2006 census, its population was 19, in 6 families.

References 

Populated places in Kerman County